Tarcisio Fusco was an Italian composer of film scores. He was the brother of the composer Giovanni Fusco and the uncle of operatic soprano Cecilia Fusco.

Selected filmography
 Boccaccio (1940)
 Free Escape (1951)
 Abracadabra (1952)
 The Eternal Chain (1952)
 Beauties in Capri (1952)
 Milanese in Naples (1954)
 Conspiracy of the Borgias (1959)

References

Bibliography 
 John Stewart. Italian film: a who's who. McFarland, 1994.

External links 
 

1904 births
Year of death unknown
People from the Province of Benevento
Italian composers